VSM may refer to:

Organisations
 Varanger Sami Museum, a museum in Varangerbotn, Norway
 Veluwsche Stoomtrein Maatschappij, a Dutch heritage railway
 Vickers, Sons & Maxim, a British armaments and ammunition manufacturer of the early 20th century
 Villa Sainte-Marcelline, a private school in Westmount, Canada
 VSM Group or Viking Sewing Machines, a Swedish company
 Vysoká škola manažmentu or City University of Seattle in Slovakia, a private college

Science and technology
 Variance shadow map, a process by which shadows are added to 3D computer graphics
 Vascular smooth muscle, a type of muscle found in blood vessels
 Vector space model, an algebraic model for representing objects as vectors of identifiers
 Vena saphena magna, a vein of the leg
 Viable system model, a model of an autonomous system capable of producing itself
 Vibrating-sample magnetometer, a scientific instrument

Other uses
 Value-stream mapping, a product management method
 Vietnam Service Medal, a military award of the United States Armed Forces
 Vishisht Seva Medal, a military award of the Indian Armed Forces
 Voluntary Student Membership, a policy for New Zealand university student organisations